Boneh-ye Zamin (also Romanized as Boneh-ye Zamīn and Boneh Zamīn) is a village in Pir Kuh Rural District, Deylaman District, Siahkal County, Gilan Province, Iran. At the 2006 census, its population was 406, in 93 families.

References 

Populated places in Siahkal County